Martyna Dąbkowska (born 25 May 1989 in Gdynia) is a Polish group rhythmic gymnast representing her nation at international competitions.

She participated at the 2004 Summer Olympics in the all-around event together with Justyna Banasiak, Aleksandra Wójcik, Małgorzata Ławrynowicz, Anna Mrozińska and Aleksandra Zawistowska finishing 10th.

She competed at world championships, including at the 2005, and 2007 World Rhythmic Gymnastics Championships.

References

External links
 

1989 births
Living people
Polish rhythmic gymnasts
Sportspeople from Gdynia
Olympic gymnasts of Poland
Gymnasts at the 2004 Summer Olympics